John David Bassett, Sr. (July 14, 1866- February 26, 1965) was a noted American industrialist who formed the Bassett Furniture Company in 1902. During the late 1960s, the Bassett Furniture Industries, Inc., was the largest manufacturer of wooden furniture in the world, with sales of over $118 million in 1968.

Early life
"Here this man of initiative and administrative talent was born July 14, 1866, a son of John H. and Nancy J. (Spencer) Bassett, the former of whom was born near Preston, Virginia in Henry County, and the latter in Patrick County, Virginia, both families having early been founded in Virginia." He was also the grandson of Alexander Hunter Bassett

As the son of an ex-Confederate soldier in rural Virginia, John Bassett made a minimal existence as a farmer, working as a tobacco pinholder, store keeper, sawmill operator, and lumberman supplying railroad ties for the Norfolk and Western Railway in 1889.

He married Pocahontas "Pokey" Hundley (November 21, 1862 - January 11, 1953), and together they had four children: William McKinley Bassett (1894-1960) married Lela Gladys Clark and built Eltham Manor in 1936; Blanche E. Bassett, who married Taylor George Vaughan; Ann Pocahontas Bassett married Thomas B. Stanley; John Douglas Bassett (1901-1966).

At the age of 35, John D. Bassett and his brothers, Samuel Henry Bassett and Charles Columbus Bassett, and his brother-in-law, Reed Lewis Stone, along with the capital funds of $11,000, organized the Bassett Furniture Company. The original company has expanded greatly over the years, purchasing and selling a number of furniture manufacturing companies and associated industries, and in 2009 had over 1,329 employees.

Politics
While southwestern Virginia voted strongly Democratic in the early 20th century, John D. Bassett supported the Republican ticket. "In an effort to advance its members' socioeconomic and ethnic views, the Ku Klux Klan turned to politics. In 1925, in addition to supporting a bill that would forbid the teaching of evolution in Virginia schools, the Virginia Klan campaigned against John M. Purcell, the incumbent Democratic state treasurer and a Roman Catholic. Klan members threw their support behind Purcell's Republican opponent, John David Bassett, whom they styled "the 100% candidate." Bassett lost the election, but performed surprisingly well in a state controlled by a very strong Democratic machine."

Death and Burial
John D. Bassett died on February 26, 1965, and is buried at the Bassett Family Cemetery in Bassett, Virginia.

Legacy
Bassett Furniture was started by John D. Bassett in 1902, who remained its president until 1930.

The town of Bassett, Virginia, was named for his family.

The John D. Bassett High School was named in his honor.

Bibliography
 American Furniture Manufacturers Association. American Furniture Hall of Fame Induction Banquet. High Point, N.C.: American Furniture Manufacturers, 1997. Notes: The induction of new members to the American Furniture Hall of Fame with Mary McKenzie Henkel of Winchester, Va. being among the inductees. Includes a brief overview of the current members including John D. Bassett. http://www.worldcat.org/oclc/44273670
 Bassett, Mary Henrian. The Bassett Family in Henry County, Virginia, with Stories, Mainly of the Woodson Bassett Branch. Martinsville, Va: Bassett, 1976. http://www.worldcat.org/oclc/2856828
 John D. Bassett: Brief Sketch of Life of Republican Candidate for State Treasurer As Known to His Home People. Martinsville, Va: Bulletin Print, 1925. http://www.worldcat.org/oclc/24995500
 Macy, Beth. Factory man: how one furniture maker battled offshoring, stayed local—and helped save an American town. 2014. http://www.worldcat.org/oclc/862790783

References

People from Henry County, Virginia
American industrialists
American furniture designers
American cabinetmakers
1866 births
1965 deaths
 Virginia Republicans